Hemotoxins, haemotoxins or hematotoxins are toxins  that destroy red blood cells, disrupt blood clotting, and/or cause organ degeneration and generalized tissue damage. The term hemotoxin is to some degree a misnomer since toxins that damage the blood also damage other tissues. Injury from a hemotoxic agent is often very painful and can cause permanent damage and in severe cases death. Loss of an affected limb is possible even with prompt treatment.

Hemotoxins are frequently employed by venomous animals, including snakes (vipers and pit vipers) and spiders (brown recluse). Animal venoms contain enzymes and other proteins that are hemotoxic or neurotoxic or occasionally both (as in the Mojave rattlesnake, the Japanese mamushi, and similar species). In addition to killing the prey, part of the function of a hemotoxic venom for some animals is to aid digestion. The venom breaks down protein in the region of the bite, making prey easier to digest.

The process by which a hemotoxin causes death is much slower than that of a neurotoxin.  Snakes which envenomate a prey animal may have to track the prey as it flees.  Typically, a mammalian prey item will stop fleeing not because of death, but due to shock caused by the venomous bite. Symptoms are dependent upon species, size, location of bite and the amount of venom injected. In humans, symptoms include nausea, disorientation, and headache; these may be delayed for several hours.

Hemotoxins are used in diagnostic studies of the coagulation system. Lupus anticoagulant is detected by changes in the dilute Russell's viper venom time, which is a laboratory assay based on—as its name indicates—venom of the Russell's viper.

References

External links 

 Introduction to the special edition of Journal of Toxicology - Toxin Reviews, 21(1 & 2)

Toxins by organ system affected
Hematology